PKP class SM01 was a Polish name for German diesel shunting locomotives class used by PKP. Three of the locomotives brought to Poland after the War were produced between 1934 and 1945 in several works in Germany.

History
SM01 class was in fact a German DRG Köf II shunter. At present one preserved item is deployed in Skierniewice depot.

It is unclear whether those locomotives were indeed operating under SM01 name, as they could have been withdrawn from service before changing naming standards in 1960.

Technical data
SM01 locomotives in fact slightly differed between units, mostly regarding exterior. It is a Bo locomotive, which means there are two powered axles under the unit. These axles are not articulated relative to other parts of the locomotive. The locomotive is propelled by a diesel engine and the power was supplied to axles through mechanical transmission.

Railway locomotives introduced in 1934
SM01
Diesel locomotives of Poland
B locomotives
Standard gauge locomotives of Poland